Anamaria Vartolomei (born 9 April 1999) is a French-Romanian actress. She began her career as a child actress in the film My Little Princess (2011). She won the Lumières Award for Best Actress and the César Award for Most Promising Actress for her performance in Happening (2021). She appeared on the UniFrance and Screen International list of rising French talents to watch.

Early life and education
Vartolomei was born in Bacău and lived in the Plopu village of Dărmănești. Her parents began working abroad when Vartolomei was as young as two, first in England and later France. Having been cared for by her grandparents in the meantime, she joined her parents at the age of six, settling in Issy-les-Moulineaux. She attended l'école Anatole France. She trained in acting at the Cours Florent and Les Enfants Terribles. She was admitted to the Sorbonne, but opted not to go in favour of her acting career.

Filmography

Awards and nominations

References

External links

Living people
1999 births
French child actresses
French film actresses
People from Bacău
People from Issy-les-Moulineaux
Romanian child actresses
Romanian emigrants to France
Romanian film actresses
21st-century French actresses